The International Student Initiative for Pluralist Economics (ISIPE) is an alliance of university student groups and societies from several countries campaigning for a reform of economics education and research. Founded in early 2014, the Initiative brings together various groups that had previously operated at a local or national level such as Rethinking Economics. It argues for a reorientation of the discipline toward pluralism in university curricula as well as research activity, involving the inclusion and equal treatment of heterodox approaches, greater interdisciplinarity, as well as increased awareness of methodological issues, the history of economic thought, and economic history.

Background 

In the second half of the 20th century, the discipline of economics came to be increasingly dominated by what is seen by the Initiative as a fundamentally uniform, monolithic approach (which may be referred to as mainstream, neoclassical, orthodox, or dominant paradigm economics), with alternatives becoming marginalised in education and research. The case for pluralism in economics had previously been made by similar initiatives such as the '1992 Plea' organised by FEED. The 2007 financial crisis and its aftermath appear to have provided new impetus, with various new organisations having been founded since then.

In May 2014, The Guardian reported that in nineteen countries students criticised economics courses for falling wider society.

Manifesto 

ISIPE released an international manifesto on 5 May 2014. The manifesto took the form of an open letter, signed by 42 student groups across 19 countries.

The release of the international manifesto was met with a large media echo in various countries. As of 29 May 2014, 2400 individuals in 99 countries, mostly from academia, have signed up in support of the plea.

Since the release of the manifesto, the initiative has grown significantly, now comprising 65 student groups from 30 countries.

Political alignment 

ISIPE aims to be politically neutral. Its objective is not to promote a particular point of view or methodology, but to promote the idea that having multiple points of view and multiple methodologies is a good thing. While some associated with the movement are primarily interested in certain branches of economics, the movement itself aims promote non-orthodox economic thought in general. Various groups have called for the inclusion of both Marxian and Austrian Schools of thought in the economics curriculum, representing almost polar opposites of the political spectrum.

Membership 

The founding organisations of ISIPE are:

 Sociedad de Economía Crítica Argentina y Uruguay; Argentina
 Gesellschaft für Plurale Ökonomik Wien; Austria
 Nova Ágora; Brazil
 Mouvement étudiant québécois pour un enseignement pluraliste de l'économie; Canada
 Estudios Nueva Economía; Chile
 Det Samfundsøkonomiske Selskab (DSS)); Denmark
 Post-Crash Economics Society Essex; England
 Cambridge Society for Economic Pluralism; England
 Better Economics UCL ; England
 Post-Crash Economics Society Manchester; England
 SOAS Open Economics Forum; England
 Alternative Thinking for Economics Society, Sheffield University; England
 LSE Post-Crash Economics; England
 Pour un Enseignement Pluraliste de l'Economie dans le Supérieur (PEPS-Economie); France
 Netzwerk Plurale Ökonomik (Network for Pluralist Economics); Germany
 Oikos Köln; Germany
 Real World Economics, Mainz; Germany
 Kritische WissenschaftlerInnen Berlin; Germany
 Arbeitskreis Plurale Ökonomik, Bayreuth; Germany
 Arbeitskreis Plurale Ökonomik, München; Germany
 Oikos Leipzig; Germany
 Was ist Ökonomie, Berlin; Germany
 Impuls. für eine neue Wirtschaft, Erfurt; Germany
 Ecoation, Augsburg; Germany
 Kritische Ökonomen, Frankfurt; Germany
 Arbeitskreis Plurale Ökonomik, Hamburg; Germany
 Real World Economics, Heidelberg; Germany
 Stundent HUB Weltethos Institut Tübingen ; Germany
 LIE - Lost in Economics e.V., Regensburg; Germany
 Jodhpur University Heterdox Economics Association; India
 Economics Student Forum – Haifa; Israel
 Economics Student Forum - Tel Aviv; Israel
 Rethinking Economics Italia; Italy
 Oeconomicus Economic Club MGIMO ; Russia
 Glasgow University Real World Economics Society; Scotland
 Movement for Pluralistic Economics; Slovenia
 Post-Crash Barcelona; Spain
 Lunds Kritiska Ekonomer; Sweden
 Handels Students for Sustainability; Sweden
 PEPS-Helvetia; Switzerland
 Rethinking Economics UK; UK
 Rethinking Economics NL; Netherlands
 Rethinking Economics New York; United States
 Sociedad de Economía Crítica Argentina y Uruguay; Uruguay

References

External links
 Official Website of ISIPE

Economics societies